Nicholas Nayfack (January 27, 1909 – March 31, 1958) was an American movie producer whose notable works include Forbidden Planet and The Invisible Boy.  He was the nephew of MGM studio chief Nicholas Schenck and United Artists studio boss Joseph M. Schenck.  He married actress Lynne Carver in 1937. Nayfack died of a heart attack, aged 49, on March 31, 1958.

Career
Nayfack worked for 20th Century Fox as an associate producer under Darryl F. Zanuck from 1937 to 1939.  After leaving Fox, he became the head of the business affairs office for MGM from 1939 through 1949. In 1949, Nayfack became a producer for MGM until his death in 1958.

Filmography
Border Incident (1949)
Devil's Doorway (1950)
Vengeance Valley (1951)
No Questions Asked (1951)
The Sellout (1952)
Glory Alley (1952)
Escape from Fort Bravo (1953)
Rogue Cop (1954)
The Scarlet Coat (1955)
Ransom! (1956)
Forbidden Planet (1956)
The Power and the Prize (1956)
Gun Glory (1957)
The Invisible Boy (1957)

References

External links

Film producers from New York (state)
1909 births
1958 deaths
20th-century American businesspeople
Businesspeople from New York City